A Mule for the Marquesa (1964) is a novel by Frank O'Rourke.  The film The Professionals (1966) is based on it.   After the release of the film, new editions of the novel were issued under the title The Professionals.

1964 American novels
Western (genre) novels
American novels adapted into films
Novels set in Mexico
Novels set in Texas
William Morrow and Company books